Kara Denby (born May 28, 1986) is an American swimmer.  She swam for the United States team at the 2008 FINA Short Course World Championships, where she won a gold medal and set a world record in the women's 4 × 100 m medley relay along with Margaret Hoelzer, Jessica Hardy and Rachel Komisarz.

Denby was a 24-time All-American at Auburn University between the years of 2004 and 2008. In 2006 and 2007 the Auburn University Women's Swimming and Diving team took home the NCAA National Team title.

See also
 List of Auburn University people
 World record progression 4 × 100 metres medley relay

References

External links
 
 YouTube

1986 births
Living people
American female breaststroke swimmers
American female freestyle swimmers
Auburn Tigers women's swimmers
World record setters in swimming
Medalists at the FINA World Swimming Championships (25 m)
Universiade medalists in swimming
Universiade gold medalists for the United States
Medalists at the 2007 Summer Universiade
21st-century American women